St. Paul's Hospital is a Roman Catholic hospital in Causeway Bay on Hong Kong Island of Hong Kong.

Naming
The hospital is colloquially known as the French Hospital

History
The hospital grew out of the caring activities undertaken by the Sisters of the Roman Catholic Christian order St. Paul de Chartres for the poor and underprivileged of the Wan Chai and Happy Valley areas of Hong Kong Island, which commenced in the mid-19th century after the order had first established itself in the then British colony. 

Today St Paul's Hospital is a modern and well-established hospital located in the Causeway Bay area of Hong Kong Island. It has more than 400 beds and excellent equipment, and offers a very wide range of specialisations. All patients are treated and cared for regardless of colour, race or creed.

In 1940, a companion hospital, St. Teresa's Hospital, was founded by the Pauline Sisters.

St Paul's Hospital maintains very high clinical, governance and educational standards and is a member of Hong Kong Private Hospitals Association.

St Paul's Hospital is surveyed and accredited bi-annually by QHA Trent Accreditation Scheme of the United Kingdom, a major international healthcare accreditation group.

See also 
St. Teresa's Hospital
List of hospitals in Hong Kong
International healthcare accreditation

References

External links

Hospitals in Hong Kong
Medical Services by Catholic community in Hong Kong
Hospitals established in 1898
Causeway Bay